Dams is a surname. Notable people with the surname include:

Jimi Dams (born 1963), American artist
Marguerita Dams (born 1947), Belgian cyclist
Niklas Dams (born 1990), German footballer
Pierre-Ernest Dams (1794–1855), Luxembourgian politician, judge and journalist

See also
Lloyd van Dams (born 1972), Surinamese-Dutch kickboxer
 Dam, Danish surname